Tisias (fl. 5th century BC), along with Corax of Syracuse, was one of the founders of ancient Greek rhetoric. Tisias was reputed to have been the pupil of the lawyer Corax, who agreed to teach Tisias under the condition that he would give him payment for schooling if he won his first case. If on the other hand, he did not win his first case he would not have to pay the fee because the instruction was useless. Tisias is said to have developed legal rhetoric upon the foundations laid by Corax's pioneering work in the field of philosophical argument. He is also believed to have been the teacher of Isocrates. It has sometimes been asserted that Tisias and Corax are merely legendary personages. Other scholars contend that Corax and Tisias were the same person. All we know of the work of Tisias is from references made by later writers, such as Plato, Aristotle, and Cicero.

External links
Americanrhetoric.com

Ancient Greek rhetoricians
Sophists